In geometry, the gyroelongated triangular cupola is one of the Johnson solids  (J22). It can be constructed by attaching a hexagonal antiprism to the base of a triangular cupola (J3).  This is called "gyroelongation", which means that an antiprism is joined to the base of a solid, or between the bases of more than one solid.

The gyroelongated triangular cupola can also be seen as a gyroelongated triangular bicupola (J44) with one triangular cupola removed. Like all cupolae, the base polygon has twice as many sides as the top (in this case, the bottom polygon is a hexagon because the top is a triangle).

Formulae
The following formulae for volume and surface area can be used if all faces are regular, with edge length a:

Dual polyhedron 

The dual of the gyroelongated triangular cupola has 15 faces: 6 kites, 3 rhombi, and 6 pentagons.

References

External links
 

Johnson solids